The Dallas–Fort Worth metroplex based professional wrestling promotion World Class Wrestling Association (WCWA) held produced and scripted a number of supercard shows. Matches from some of these shows were taped for future television shows. The World Class Wrestling Association started out under the name "Southwest Sports" from 1940 to 1966, then known as "Big Time Wrestling", a member of the National Wrestling Alliance (NWA), from 1966 until 1982. In 1982 the promotion was renamed World Class Championship Wrestling (WCCW) and grew beyond the limits of the Texas territory, with syndicated television shows available across the United States and internationally. The company was renamed World Class Wrestling Association in 1986 when they left the NWA.

Southwest Sports

NWA Big Time Wrestling

World Class Championship Wrestling

World Class Wrestling Association

See also

List of All Elite Wrestling pay-per-view events
List of ECW supercards and pay-per-view events
List of FMW supercards and pay-per-view events
List of Global Force Wrestling events and specials
List of Impact Wrestling pay-per-view events
List of Major League Wrestling events
List of National Wrestling Alliance pay-per-view events
List of NJPW pay-per-view events
List of NWA/WCW closed-circuit events and pay-per-view events
List of Ring of Honor pay-per-view events
List of Smokey Mountain Wrestling supercard events
List of WWA pay-per-view events
List of WWE pay-per-view and WWE Network events

References

 
Professional wrestling-related lists